Kolodezhnoye is a rural locality (a selo) and the administrative center of Kolodezhanskoye Rural Settlement, Podgorensky District, Voronezh Oblast, Russia. The population was 643 as of 2010. There are 5 streets.

Geography 
Kolodezhnoye is located 34 km northeast of Podgorensky (the district's administrative centre) by road. Pokrovka is the nearest rural locality.

References 

Rural localities in Podgorensky District